Brinton is a village and a civil parish  in the English county of Norfolk. The village is 10.8 miles east-north-east of the town of Fakenham, 13.1 miles west south-west of Cromer and 125 miles north-north-east of London.

History
Brinton's name is of Anglo-Saxon origin and derives from the Old English for a farmstead or settlement named after Bryni.

In the Domesday Book, Brinton is mentioned as consisting of 12 households, belonging to Bishop William of Thetford.

In 1822, Brinton Hall was reconstructed based on its previous Georgian and Sixteenth Century designs. The hall is surrounded by gardens and parkland and boasts a greenhouse. 

The village was used as the backdrop for the BBC medical drama, Dangerfield.

St. Andrew's Church
Brinton's Parish Church is dedicated to Saint Andrew and is of Norman origin. The church was significantly remodelled in the 1520s and the stained glass was replaced in the 1890s by A. L. Moore.

Transport
The nearest railway station is at Sheringham for the Bittern Line which runs between Sheringham, Cromer and Norwich. The nearest airport is Norwich International Airport.

Notable people
 John Astley- Church of England Clergyman

War Memorial
Brinton's War Memorial takes the form of a brass plaque in St. Andrew's Church which lists the following name for the First World War:
 Private Hubert C. Rice (1887-1917), 1st Field Ambulance, Royal Australian Army Medical Corps

References

 
Villages in Norfolk
Civil parishes in Norfolk
North Norfolk